Deer High School (DHS) is an accredited comprehensive public high school located in Deer, Arkansas, United States. DHS provides secondary education for approximately 95 students in grades 7 through 12. It is one of four public high schools in Newton County and one of two high schools administered by the Deer/Mount Judea School District.

It was previously a part of the Deer School District. On July 1, 2004, the Deer district consolidated with the Mount Judea School District to form the Deer/Mount Judea School District.

Academics 
Deer High School is a Title I school that is accredited by the Arkansas Department of Education (ADE). The assumed course of study follows the ADE Smart Core curriculum, which requires students complete at least 22 units prior to graduation. Students complete regular coursework and exams and may take Advanced Placement (AP) courses and exam with the opportunity to receive college credit.

Athletics 
The Deer High School mascot for academic and athletic teams is the deer stylized as the Antlers with red and white as the school colors.

The Deer Antlers compete in interscholastic activities within the 1A Classification, the state's smallest classification administered by the Arkansas Activities Association. For 2012–14, the Antlers played within the 1A East Conference.

Deer fields junior varsity and varsity teams in basketball (boys/girls), baseball, softball, track and field (boys/girls), along with cheer and dance.

References

External links 
 

Public high schools in Arkansas
Public middle schools in Arkansas
Schools in Newton County, Arkansas